Rakudo is a Raku compiler targeting MoarVM, and the Java Virtual Machine, that implements the Raku specification. It is currently the only major Raku compiler in active development.

Originally developed within the Parrot project, the Rakudo source code repository was split from the project in February 2009 so that it could be developed independently, although there were still many dependencies at the time. Rakudo is written in C, Raku, and the lightweight Raku subset NQP (Not Quite Perl).

Rakudo Perl #14 was released in February 2009, codenamed Vienna after the Perl mongers group that had sponsored one of its developers since April 2008. Subsequent releases have used codenames based on Perl mongers groups.

The first major release of a distribution of both compiler and modules (named "Rakudo *" or "Rakudo Star") was on July 29, 2010.

Name 
The name "Rakudo" for the Raku compiler was first suggested by Damian Conway.  "Rakudo" is short for "Rakuda-dō" (with a long 'o'; 駱駝道), which is Japanese for "Way of the Camel".  "Rakudo" (with a short 'o'; 楽土) also means "paradise" in Japanese.

The term "Rakudo" was also chosen to distinguish between the name of a language implementation ("Rakudo") from the name of the language specification ("Raku") – any implementation that passes the official test suite could call itself "Raku".  There are currently several implementations at various levels of maturity, with only Rakudo implementing full Raku and NQP for Raku subset.

Books

References

External links 
 Rakudo website

Raku (programming language)
Software using the Artistic license